The Lgov Constituency (No.98) was a Russian legislative constituency in the Kursk Oblast. The constituency covered upstate Western and Central Kursk Oblast until 2007. Since 2016 most of the constituency was placed into Kursk constituency.

Members elected

Election results

1993

|-
! colspan=2 style="background-color:#E9E9E9;text-align:left;vertical-align:top;" |Candidate
! style="background-color:#E9E9E9;text-align:left;vertical-align:top;" |Party
! style="background-color:#E9E9E9;text-align:right;" |Votes
! style="background-color:#E9E9E9;text-align:right;" |%
|-
|style="background-color:"|
|align=left|Aleksandr Potapenko
|align=left|Independent
|
|19.10%
|-
|style="background-color:"|
|align=left|Valentina Luneva
|align=left|Agrarian Party
| -
|15.50%
|-
| colspan="5" style="background-color:#E9E9E9;"|
|- style="font-weight:bold"
| colspan="3" style="text-align:left;" | Total
| 
| 100%
|-
| colspan="5" style="background-color:#E9E9E9;"|
|- style="font-weight:bold"
| colspan="4" |Source:
|
|}

1995

|-
! colspan=2 style="background-color:#E9E9E9;text-align:left;vertical-align:top;" |Candidate
! style="background-color:#E9E9E9;text-align:left;vertical-align:top;" |Party
! style="background-color:#E9E9E9;text-align:right;" |Votes
! style="background-color:#E9E9E9;text-align:right;" |%
|-
|style="background-color:"|
|align=left|Aleksandr Potapenko (incumbent)
|align=left|Communist Party
|
|38.92%
|-
|style="background-color:#959698"|
|align=left|Vladimir Mikhalchev
|align=left|Derzhava
|
|15.52%
|-
|style="background-color:"|
|align=left|Sergey Alferov
|align=left|Independent
|
|11.78%
|-
|style="background-color:"|
|align=left|Vitaly Gukov
|align=left|Agrarian Party
|
|11.54%
|-
|style="background-color:"|
|align=left|Anatoly Bozhko
|align=left|Independent
|
|3.87%
|-
|style="background-color:"|
|align=left|Aleksandr Klesov
|align=left|Independent
|
|3.83%
|-
|style="background-color:"|
|align=left|Vasily Domnikov
|align=left|Independent
|
|2.66%
|-
|style="background-color:#CE1100"|
|align=left|Viktor Androsov
|align=left|My Fatherland
|
|1.68%
|-
|style="background-color:#000000"|
|colspan=2 |against all
|
|7.96%
|-
| colspan="5" style="background-color:#E9E9E9;"|
|- style="font-weight:bold"
| colspan="3" style="text-align:left;" | Total
| 
| 100%
|-
| colspan="5" style="background-color:#E9E9E9;"|
|- style="font-weight:bold"
| colspan="4" |Source:
|
|}

1999

|-
! colspan=2 style="background-color:#E9E9E9;text-align:left;vertical-align:top;" |Candidate
! style="background-color:#E9E9E9;text-align:left;vertical-align:top;" |Party
! style="background-color:#E9E9E9;text-align:right;" |Votes
! style="background-color:#E9E9E9;text-align:right;" |%
|-
|style="background-color:"|
|align=left|Aleksandr Chetverikov
|align=left|Independent
|
|28.13%
|-
|style="background-color:"|
|align=left|Aleksandr Potapenko (incumbent)
|align=left|Communist Party
|
|24.00%
|-
|style="background-color:"|
|align=left|Aleksey Volkov
|align=left|Independent
|
|14.58%
|-
|style="background-color:#3B9EDF"|
|align=left|Aleksandr Chukhrayov
|align=left|Fatherland – All Russia
|
|10.58%
|-
|style="background-color:"|
|align=left|Vladimir Bushenkov
|align=left|Independent
|
|6.17%
|-
|style="background-color:"|
|align=left|Pyotr Novikov
|align=left|Independent
|
|5.38%
|-
|style="background-color:"|
|align=left|Sergey Vasilyev
|align=left|Independent
|
|2.51%
|-
|style="background-color:"|
|align=left|Vasily Korchev
|align=left|Our Home – Russia
|
|0.75%
|-
|style="background-color:"|
|align=left|Vladimir Kutsenko
|align=left|Independent
|
|0.68%
|-
|style="background-color:#000000"|
|colspan=2 |against all
|
|9.84%
|-
| colspan="5" style="background-color:#E9E9E9;"|
|- style="font-weight:bold"
| colspan="3" style="text-align:left;" | Total
| 
| 100%
|-
| colspan="5" style="background-color:#E9E9E9;"|
|- style="font-weight:bold"
| colspan="4" |Source:
|
|}

2003

|-
! colspan=2 style="background-color:#E9E9E9;text-align:left;vertical-align:top;" |Candidate
! style="background-color:#E9E9E9;text-align:left;vertical-align:top;" |Party
! style="background-color:#E9E9E9;text-align:right;" |Votes
! style="background-color:#E9E9E9;text-align:right;" |%
|-
|style="background-color:"|
|align=left|Aleksey Volkov
|align=left|United Russia
|
|25.40%
|-
|style="background-color:"|
|align=left|Aleksandr Chetverikov (incumbent)
|align=left|Independent
|
|17.74%
|-
|style="background-color:"|
|align=left|Viktor Vyrozhemsky
|align=left|Independent
|
|12.90%
|-
|style="background-color:"|
|align=left|Aleksandr Potapenko
|align=left|Communist Party
|
|11.02%
|-
|style="background-color:"|
|align=left|Viktor Zyukin
|align=left|Independent
|
|7.96%
|-
|style="background-color:"|
|align=left|Vasily Oleynikov
|align=left|Independent
|
|3.07%
|-
|style="background-color:"|
|align=left|Vitaly Gukov
|align=left|Agrarian Party
|
|2.27%
|-
|style="background-color:"|
|align=left|Vadim Chelpanov
|align=left|Liberal Democratic Party
|
|1.98%
|-
|style="background-color:"|
|align=left|Margarita Aseeva
|align=left|Russian Communist Workers' Party — Russian Party of Communists
|
|1.79%
|-
|style="background:"| 
|align=left|Mikhail Smolin
|align=left|Yabloko
|
|1.18%
|-
|style="background-color:"|
|align=left|Pyotr Zerin
|align=left|Independent
|
|0.99%
|-
|style="background-color:#1042A5"|
|align=left|Valery Skripkin
|align=left|Union of Right Forces
|
|0.55%
|-
|style="background-color:#164C8C"|
|align=left|Violetta Kuznetsova
|align=left|United Russian Party Rus'
|
|0.51%
|-
|style="background-color:#00A1FF"|
|align=left|Grigory Amnuel
|align=left|Party of Russia's Rebirth-Russian Party of Life
|
|0.30%
|-
|style="background:#7C73CC"| 
|align=left|Anatoly Nevezhin
|align=left|Great Russia–Eurasian Union
|
|0.27%
|-
|style="background-color:#000000"|
|colspan=2 |against all
|
|8.90%
|-
| colspan="5" style="background-color:#E9E9E9;"|
|- style="font-weight:bold"
| colspan="3" style="text-align:left;" | Total
| 
| 100%
|-
| colspan="5" style="background-color:#E9E9E9;"|
|- style="font-weight:bold"
| colspan="4" |Source:
|
|}

Notes

References

Obsolete Russian legislative constituencies
Politics of Kursk Oblast